Madisonville North Hopkins High School (MNHHS) located in Madisonville, Kentucky, United States, opened in fall 1968. The school, located on Hanson Road, replaced the old Madisonville High School. Classes had graduated from the Spring Street facility from 1939 to 1968. The building now houses Browning Springs Middle School. MNHHS is one of two high schools in the Hopkins County school district, the other being Hopkins County Central High School.

Academics
North has a curriculum of several Advanced Placement classes, including: English, World History, U.S. History, Government and Politics: United States, French, Spanish, Statistics, Biology, and Chemistry. The school day at MNHHS consists of 5 periods, with each period lasting 70 minutes. 26 credits are required to graduate.

Activities
The Madisonville North Hopkins Marching Maroon Band regularly competes in the Kentucky State Marching Band Championships and were finalists in 1986, 1989, 1993, 1994, 1997, 1998, 2001, 2002, 2004, 2005, 2006, 2007, 2008, 2009, 2010, 2011, 2012, 2013, 2014, and 2015, and are the 2005, 2006, 2007, 2008, 2009, 2010, 2011, 2012, 2013, and 2014 state AAAA champions.

The Madisonville North Hopkins Maroon "powerlifting" team has won the AAA state championship for 4 years, however, it is not a KHSAA sponsored sport.

The Future Problem Solving team won the international championship in 2006 and 2007. The Academic Team has won District 5 and Region 2 for the past 6 years, placed 2nd at State in 2006, and placed 3rd at state in 2007.

The Madisonville North Hopkins Maroon cheerleaders were the 2009 KAPOS Small Varsity State Champions.

The school recently added an Archery Team in 2012. The team will compete against the surrounding counties, KHSAA does not recognize this as a sponsored sport, much like the Powerlifting team.

Notable alumni
Jeremy Clark, NFL cornerback for the New York Jets
Sonny Collins, former NFL running back
Travis Ford, former basketball player & current coach
Bill Hagerty, incumbent U.S. Senator and former ambassador to Japan
Claudia Kawas, neuroscientist 
Frank Ramsey, former professional basketball player & coach

References

External links
School website
Marching Maroons website
Maroons Football

Public high schools in Kentucky
Schools in Hopkins County, Kentucky